Takahito Suzuki (鈴木 貴人), born August 17, 1975, is a Japanese retired professional ice hockey Right Winger. He also served as the head coach of the Japanese national team.

References

1975 births
Asian Games gold medalists for Japan
Asian Games silver medalists for Japan
Asian Games medalists in ice hockey
Charlotte Checkers (1993–2010) players
Japanese ice hockey right wingers
Living people
Medalists at the 2007 Asian Winter Games
Medalists at the 2011 Asian Winter Games
Ice hockey players at the 2007 Asian Winter Games
Ice hockey players at the 2011 Asian Winter Games
Nikkō Ice Bucks players
People from Tomakomai, Hokkaido
Seibu Prince Rabbits players
Sportspeople from Hokkaido